The Age of Revolution: Europe: 1789–1848 is a book by Eric Hobsbawm, first published in 1962. It is the first in a trilogy of books about "the long 19th century" (coined by Hobsbawm), followed by The Age of Capital: 1848–1875, and The Age of Empire: 1875–1914. A fourth book, The Age of Extremes: The Short Twentieth Century, 1914–1991, acts as a sequel to the trilogy.

Hobsbawm analyzed the early 19th century, and indeed the whole process of modernisation thereafter, using what he calls the twin revolution thesis. This thesis recognized the dual importance of the French Revolution and the Industrial Revolution as midwives of modern European history, and – through the connections of colonialism and imperialism – world history.

Hobsbawm begins The Age of Revolution: Europe: 1789–1848 by noting the invention of so many words, or the words that took on their modern meanings, in the 59-year period covered by the book; some examples of such words he gives are, "industrialist", "middle class", "working class", "socialism", and "statistics". He uses this as an example of how profoundly revolutionary the period 1789 to 1848 was, and how it transformed human society and created our modern world as we know it. The two engines of this profound revolution, Hobsbawm argues, was the "dual revolution" of the French Revolution and the Industrial Revolution, with the former's impact being primarily in the political realm and latter's impact primarily in the socio-economic realm. The ideas that sprung from this "dual revolution" would develop and interact with each other, and in the process, construct many of the ideologies, conceptions, and norms of modern society that we take as a given (such as the idea of humans being endowed with natural rights, popular sovereignty, the employer-employee relationship and dynamic, the division of society into economic/income classes as opposed to estates or orders as in the Middle Ages and Early Modern Europe, promotion due to competence and merit rather than aristocratic privilege, etc.).

Hobsbawm's period of study begins with the outbreak of two revolutions: The Industrial Revolution and the French Revolution. His period ends, once again, in revolution: The Revolutions of 1848 (though they are not actually covered until his second volume, The Age of Capital: 1848–1875). In between these start and end points, Hobsbawm traces the ways in which the "dual revolution" radically altered societies — mainly English and European continental societies, though some coverage is given to non-European societies, and with some keen insights into them even if they are brief.

Contents
 Part I. Developments
 1. The World in the 1780s
Hobsbawm provides a tour d'horizon of what Europe, European society, and relations with the non-European societies were like in the world of the 1780s. He stresses that, for all the noticeable progress made in terms of things like increases in the number of good roads; faster mail; the mastery of overseas exploration, navigation, and trade; societies of the 1780s were still very much part of the pre-Modern — or Early Modern Period — world. In the 1780s, European society was overwhelmingly rural, to such an extent that to not appreciate this fact entails not being able to understand how the world worked at the time. Both the peasantry and the nobility were staunchly based in this rural world, in terms of their physical presence, their social outlook, their ways of conceiving of the world, and their relations to each other. While urban settlements of course existed, few a scattering a major cities across the European continent, the dominant form of urban life was the provincial town, not the life of the big cities. And unlike the urban cities that emerged in the course of the Industrial Revolution, these provincial towns' economies were ultimately heavily based on the countryside, rather than on mass production or large consumer bases or long-distance networks and markets. The land, above all, shaped the lives and relations of the majority of people in society.
 2. The Industrial Revolution
 3. The French Revolution
 4. War
 5. Peace
 6. Revolutions
 7. Nationalism
In this chapter, Hobsbawm traces the emergence of the phenomenon of nationalism. It was truly a phenomenon because, though loose notions of loyalty to one's country, or patriotism, or recognition of an overarching national character existed, the nationalism that emerged in the years between 1789 and 1848 was more novel, more comprehensive, and more 'modern' (for lack of the better word) in its conception. Nationalism emerged initially as a liberal idea, because it entailed the notion of a nation made up of individual citizens whose rights and freedoms were recognized by the nation and, in turn, citizens owed responsibility to the national good. This was in contrast to the past, when society was made up of subjects loyal to a monarch, or local noble or church overlord, and whose rights and privileges were based on the social/collective/corporative groups that the subjects belonged to, and not based on the individual. 
 Part II. Results
 8. Land
 9. Towards an Industrial World
 10. The Career Open to Talent
 11. The Labouring Poor
 12. Ideology: Religion
 13. Ideology: Secular
 14. The Arts
 15. Science
 16. Conclusion: Towards 1848

External links
 The Age of Revolution: Europe 1789–1848 full text on Hathi Trust
 The age of revolution 1789-1848 - Eric Hobsbawm | libcom.org

1962 non-fiction books
History books about Europe
History books about the United Kingdom
History books about the 19th century
20th-century history books
History books about revolutions
Books by Eric Hobsbawm
Weidenfeld & Nicolson books